The Secret Meeting is a 1951 detective novel by John Rhode, the pen name of the British writer Cecil Street. It is the fifty second in his long-running series of novels featuring Lancelot Priestley, a Golden Age armchair detective. It was published in America the same year by Dodd Mead. Unusually for the series it has an early Cold War element.

In The New York Times Anthony Boucher felt it was "only for those who enjoy the methodical plodding investigations of Dr. Priestley and Superintendent Waghorn - and even those may find the dénouement singularly unconvincing." Drexel Drake in the Chicago Sunday Tribune was more positive, considering it as "fascinating as an example of patient detecting, designed especially for admirers of Dr. Priestley’s round table processes of deduction."

Synopsis
The discover of a seemingly unidentifiable corpse in a shabby block of offices off the Gray's Inn Road in central London inexplicably proves to be linked to the assassination of a member of parliament with secret communist ties on an express train heading northwards.

References

Bibliography
 Evans, Curtis. Masters of the "Humdrum" Mystery: Cecil John Charles Street, Freeman Wills Crofts, Alfred Walter Stewart and the British Detective Novel, 1920-1961. McFarland, 2014.
 Herbert, Rosemary. Whodunit?: A Who's Who in Crime & Mystery Writing. Oxford University Press, 2003.
 Magill, Frank Northen . Critical Survey of Mystery and Detective Fiction: Authors, Volume 4. Salem Press, 1988.
 Reilly, John M. Twentieth Century Crime & Mystery Writers. Springer, 2015.

1951 British novels
Novels by Cecil Street
British crime novels
British mystery novels
British thriller novels
British detective novels
Geoffrey Bles books
Novels set in London